Mad Kids was DC Comics' spin-off of Mad.
  
Between 16 November 2005 and 2009, there were 14 issues of Mad Kids, a publication aimed at a younger demographic. Reminiscent of Nickelodeon Magazine, it emphasized current kids' entertainment (i.e. Yu-Gi-Oh!, Pokémon, High School Musical), albeit with an impudent voice.

Content
Much of the content of Mad Kids had originally appeared in the parent publication; reprinted material was chosen and edited to reflect grade schoolers' interests. But the quarterly magazine also included newly commissioned articles and cartoons, as well as puzzles, bonus inserts, a calendar and other activity-related content common to kids' magazines.

References

2005 comics debuts
2009 comics endings
Children's magazines published in the United States
Comics magazines published in the United States
Comics spin-offs
Defunct magazines published in the United States
Mad (magazine)
Magazines established in 2005
Magazines disestablished in 2009
Magazines about comics
Parody comics